The City of Hackensack is the most populous municipality and the county seat of Bergen County, in the U.S. state of New Jersey. The area was officially named New Barbadoes Township until 1921, but has informally been known as Hackensack since at least the 18th century. As of the 2020 United States census, the city's population was 46,030, its highest decennial count ever and an increase of 3,020 (+7.0%) from the 2010 census count of 43,010, which in turn reflected an increase of 333 (+0.8%) from the 42,677 counted in the 2000 census.

From a number of locations, including portions of Prospect Avenue, the New York City skyline can be seen.

The Metropolitan Campus of Fairleigh Dickinson University straddles the Hackensack River in both Hackensack and Teaneck. Hackensack is also the home of the former New Jersey Naval Museum and the World War II submarine USS Ling. Astronaut Wally Schirra is perhaps Hackensack's most famous native son. 

The city has diverse neighborhoods and land uses located close to one another. Within its borders are the Hackensack University Medical Center, a residential high-rise district about a mile long (along Prospect Avenue between Beech Street and Passaic Street), suburban neighborhoods of single-family houses, stately older homes on acre-plus lots, older two-family neighborhoods, large garden apartment complexes, industrial areas, the Bergen County Jail, a tidal river, Hackensack River County Park, Borg's Woods Nature Preserve, various city parks, large office buildings, a major college campus, the Bergen County Court House, a vibrant small-city downtown district, and various small neighborhood business districts.

History

The first inhabitants of the area were the Lenni Lenape, an Algonquian people who became known to settlers as 'the Delaware Indians.' They lived along a river they called Achinigeu-hach, or "Ackingsah-sack", which translates to stony ground—today this river is more commonly known by the name 'the Hackensack River.' A representation of Chief Oratam of the Achkinhenhcky appears on the Hackensack municipal seal. The most common explanation is that the city was named for the Native American tribe, though other sources attribute it to a Native American word variously translated as meaning "hook mouth", "stream that unites with another on low ground", "on low ground" or "land of the big snake", while another version described as "more colorful than probable" attributes the name to an inn called the "Hock and Sack".

Settlement by the Dutch West India Company in New Netherland on the west banks of the Hudson River across from New Amsterdam (present-day lower Manhattan) began in the 1630s at Pavonia, eventually leading to the establishment of Bergen (at today's Bergen Square in Jersey City) in 1660.

Oratam, sachem of the Lenni Lenape, deeded the land along mid-Hackensack River to the Dutch in 1665. The area was soon taken by the English in 1667, but kept its Dutch name. Philip Cartaret, governor of what became the proprietary colony of East Jersey granted land to Captain John Berry in the area of Achter Kol and soon after took up residence and called it "New Barbadoes," after having resided on the island of Barbados. In 1666, a deed was confirmed for the  tract that had been given earlier by Oratem to Sarah Kiersted in gratitude for her work as emissary and interpreter. Other grants were given at the English Neighborhood.

In 1675, the East Jersey Legislature established the administrative districts Bergen, Essex, Middlesex, and Monmouth. In 1683, Bergen (along with the three other counties) was officially recognized as an independent county by the Provincial Assembly. The seal of Bergen County bearing this date includes an image of an agreement between the settlers and the natives.

New Barbadoes Township, together with Acquackanonk Township, were formed by Royal charter on October 31, 1693.

In 1700, the village of Hackensack was little more than the area around Main Street from the Courthouse to around Anderson Street. New Barbadoes Township included what is now Maywood, Rochelle Park, Paramus and River Edge, along with those portions of Oradell that are west of the Hackensack River. These areas were all sparsely populated and consisted of farm fields, woods and swamplands. The few roads that existed then included the streets now known as Kinderkamack Road, Paramus Road/Passaic Street and Essex Street. The southernmost portions of what is now Hackensack were not part of New Barbadoes Township at that time and were acquired in the late 1800s.

The neighborhood that came to be known as the village of Hackensack (today the area encompassing Bergen County's municipal buildings in Hackensack) was a part of Essex County until 1710, when Bergen County, by royal decree of Queen Anne of Great Britain, was enlarged and the Township of New Barbadoes was removed from Essex County and added to Bergen County.

In 1710, the village of Hackensack (in the newly formed Township of New Barbadoes) was designated as being more centrally located and more easily reached by the majority of the Bergen County's inhabitants and, hence, was chosen as the county seat of Bergen County, as it remains today.  The earliest records of the Bergen County Board of Chosen Freeholders date back to 1715, at which time agreement was made to build a courthouse and jail complex, which was completed in 1716.

During the American Revolutionary War, George Washington headquartered in the village of Hackensack in November 1776 during the retreat from Fort Lee via New Bridge Landing and camped on 'The Green' across from the First Dutch Reformed Church on November 20, 1776. A raid by British forces against Hackensack on March 23, 1780, resulted in the destruction by fire of the original courthouse structure.

The Hackensack Improvement Commission was incorporated by an Act of the state legislature approved on April 1, 1868, within New Barbadoes township and including the village of Hackensack, with authority to develop sewers and other improvements in Hackensack.

The New Jersey Legislature passed the Township School Act in 1894, under which each village, borough, town, or city in New Jersey was delegated responsibility for its own public schools through the office of the county superintendent. Hackensack established a local board of education in 1894, as required by the new law, which took over operation of schools located in the township and established Hackensack High School. The 1894 act allowed local residents, by petition, to change municipal boundaries at will, setting off fearsome political battles statewide.

Portions of the township had been taken to form Harrington Township (June 22, 1775), Lodi Township (March 1, 1826), Midland Township (March 7, 1871) and Little Ferry (September 20, 1894). After these departures, secessions, and de-annexations, all that was left of New Barbadoes Township was the village of Hackensack and its surrounding neighborhoods of Fairmount, Red Hill and Cherry Hill. In 1896, New Barbadoes acquired a portion of Lodi Township covering an area south of Essex Street from the bend of Essex Street to the Maywood border. That same year the Hackensack Improvement commission was abolished and the City of Hackensack and New Barbadoes Township became coterminous.

The final parcel lost by New Barbadoes Township was the northeastern corner of what is now Little Ferry, which was incorporated in September 1894.

An act of the State Legislature incorporated the Fairmount section of New Barbadoes with the Hackensack Improvement Commission, and eliminated New Barbadoes Township as a political entity. On November 21, 1921, based on the results of a referendum held on November 8, 1921, New Barbadoes Township received its charter to incorporate as a city and officially took on its name "Hackensack," a name derived from its original inhabitants, the Lenni Lenape, who named it "Ackingsah-sack".

In 1933, Hackensack adopted the Manager form of government under the terms of the 1923 Municipal Manager Law, with five Council persons all elected at-large and a mayor selected by the council from among its members.

The Sears location on Main Street, which opened on October 27, 1932, and was the last freestanding Sears in the state of New Jersey, closed on September 12, 2020.

Geography

According to the United States Census Bureau, the city had a total area of 4.35 square miles (11.27 km2), including 4.19 square miles (10.86 km2) of land and 0.16 square miles (0.41 km2) of water (3.63%).

The city is bordered by the Bergen County municipalities of Bogota, Hasbrouck Heights, Little Ferry, Lodi, Maywood, Paramus, Ridgefield Park, River Edge, South Hackensack, Teaneck and Teterboro.

There are many houses of historic value, and some of these were identified in the 1990 Master Plan. The city does not have any registered historic districts, or any restrictions on preserving the historic facade in any portions of the city.  Areas considered suburban single-family residential neighborhoods account for about one-third of the city's area, mostly along its western side.

Unincorporated communities, localities and place names located partially or completely within the city include Fairmount and North Hackensack.

Demographics

Ethnic diversity
As the initial destination for many immigrants to Bergen County from around the globe, Hackensack's ethnic composition has become exceptionally diverse. As of 2013, approximately 38.9% of the population were foreign-born. In addition, 2.5% were born in the U.S. territory of Puerto Rico or abroad to American parents. 51.7% of the population over the age of five speak only English in their household, while 32.5% of the population speak Spanish at home. The South Asian and East Asian populations have increased most rapidly in Hackensack since 2000, with nearly 2,000 Indian Americans, over 1,000 Filipino Americans, and over 600 Korean Americans represented in the 2010 United States Census. Hackensack's Hispanic population has also risen rapidly, to over 15,000 in 2010; Ecuadoreans, Dominicans, and Colombians have become the top Hispanic groups in northern Hackensack. The Black population dropped as a percentage, although minimally in absolute numbers between 2000 and 2010. The city lost approximately 10% of its White population between 2000 and 2010, which has stabilized and resumed growth since 2010 and has remained substantial, at over 20,000 in 2010. The city has also witnessed greatly increasing diversity in its non-Hispanic white segment, with large numbers of Eastern Europeans, Eurasians, Central Asians, and Arabic immigrants offsetting the loss in Hackensack's earlier established Italian American, Irish American, and German American populations.

2010 census

The Census Bureau's 2006–2010 American Community Survey showed that (in 2010 inflation-adjusted dollars) median household income was $57,676 (with a margin of error of +/− $3,577) and the median family income was $66,911 (+/− $5,433). Males had a median income of $45,880 (+/− $4,012) versus $42,059 (+/− $1,681) for females. The per capita income for the city was $32,036 (+/− $1,809). About 8.9% of families and 10.7% of the population were below the poverty line, including 13.2% of those under age 18 and 11.7% of those age 65 or over.

Same-sex couples headed 145 households in 2010, an increase from the 112 counted in 2000.

2000 census
As of the 2000 United States census, there were 42,677 people, 18,113 households, and 9,545 families residing in the city. The population density was 10,358.3 people per square mile (3,999.4/km2). There were 18,945 housing units at an average density of 4,598.2 per square mile (1,775.4/km2). The racial makeup of the city was 52.61% White, 24.65% African American, 0.45% Native American, 7.45% Asian, 0.05% Pacific Islander, 9.71% from other races, and 5.08% from two or more races. Hispanic or Latino of any race were 25.92% of the population.

There were 18,113 households, out of which 21.9% had children under the age of 18 living with them, 34.8% were married couples living together, 13.0% had a female householder with no husband present, and 47.3% were non-families. 39.8% of all households were made up of individuals, and 9.4% had someone living alone who was 65 years of age or older. The average household size was 2.26 and the average family size was 3.08.

In the city, the population was spread out, with 18.2% under the age of 18, 8.6% from 18 to 24, 38.4% from 25 to 44, 22.3% from 45 to 64, and 12.5% who were 65 years of age or older. The median age was 36 years. For every 100 females, there were 98.7 males. For every 100 females age 18 and over, there were 98.5 males.

The median income for a household in the city was $49,316, and the median income for a family was $56,953. Males had a median income of $39,636 versus $32,911 for females. The per capita income for the city was $26,856. About 6.8% of families and 9.3% of the population were below the poverty line, including 9.1% of those under age 18 and 10.3% of those age 65 or over.

Government

Local government
Hackensack operates under the 1923 Municipal Manager Law form of New Jersey municipal government. The city is one of seven municipalities (of the 564) statewide that use this form of government. The City Council is comprised of five members who are elected to four-year terms on a concurrent basis in a non-partisan election held every four years in May. This form of government separates policy making (the work of the mayor and city council) from the execution of policy (the work of the city manager). This maintains professional management and a Citywide perspective through: nonpartisan election, at-large representation, concentration of executive responsibility in the hands of a professional manager accountable to the Mayor and Council, concentration of policy making power in one body: a five-person Mayor and Council. In the several decades in which the City has used the Municipal Manager form of government, Hackensack has had only nine City Managers.

, the mayor of the City of Hackensack is John P. Labrosse Jr., whose term of office as mayor ends June 30, 2025, along with those of all other councilmembers. The other members of the Hackensack City Council are Deputy Mayor Deputy Mayor Kathleen Canestrino, Leonardo "Leo" Battaglia, Gerard Carroll and Stephanie Von Rudenborg. 

Led by Mayor Labrosse, a team of candidates including four incumbents (and one newcomer) won the May 2021 municipal election. The winning slate defeated two other groups of five candidates, one of which was led by former deputy mayor David Sims.

The May 2017 election was won by the Labrosse Team, which include the mayor and three other incumbents, joined by one newcomer.

In April 2015, the city council selected Jason Some on an interim basis to fill the vacant seat of Rose Greenman, who had resigned the previous month citing claims that her council colleagues had discriminated against her. In the November 2015 general election, Deborah Keeling-Geddis was elected to serve the balance of the term of office, edging interim councilmember Jason Some by 24 votes in the final count, with four candidates running for the seat.

City Council candidate Joseph DeFalco, principal of Hackensack High School, died of a heart attack the day of the municipal election in 2005, but was elected despite his death. His running mates agreed to create a rotation under which each of the four surviving members of the New Visions for Hackensack slate would serve for a year as Mayor, creating a series of firsts for the City. Townes took office in 2005 as the city's first black mayor, and Sasso became the first female mayor in 2006. Meneses became Hackensack's first Hispanic mayor when he was sworn in on July 1, 2007, and Melfi took the reins as mayor in 2008. Four of the same five officials were re-elected in 2009 (Townes, Melfi, Sasso, Meneses), along with one opposition candidate, LaBrosse. The city council continued to rotate the mayor's seat, with the exception of Labrosse, and Melfi became mayor again in 2012.

Frank Zisa served as mayor from 1977 to 1981, Fred Cerbo from 1981 to 1989, and John F. "Jack" Zisa (son of Frank Zisa) from 1989 to 2005.

Former Assemblyman Charles "Ken" Zisa served as chief of the Hackensack Police Department from his 1995 appointment to replace John Aletta until May 2010 when he was suspended without pay on charges of official misconduct and insurance fraud. Tomas Padilla was appointed the acting police chief while the police department was being monitored by the Bergen County Prosecutors office. In May 2012, a judge ordered Zisa out of his position as police chief, a decision that cost him his police retirement benefits. In January 2013, Mike Mordaga was appointed the new civilian police director, which replaced the previous position of police chief.

Federal, state and county representation
Hackensack is located in the 5th Congressional District and is part of New Jersey's 37th state legislative district.

Politics
As of March 2011, there were a total of 19,123 registered voters in Hackensack, of which 8,630 (45.1% vs. 31.7% countywide) were registered as Democrats, 1,993 (10.4% vs. 21.1%) were registered as Republicans and 8,492 (44.4% vs. 47.1%) were registered as Unaffiliated. There were 8 voters registered as either Libertarians or Greens. Among the city's 2010 Census population, 44.5% (vs. 57.1% in Bergen County) were registered to vote, including 54.7% of those ages 18 and over (vs. 73.7% countywide).

In the 2013 gubernatorial election, Democrat Barbara Buono received 59.7% of the vote (4,268 cast), ahead of Republican Chris Christie with 39.0% (2,790 votes), and other candidates with 1.2% (89 votes), among the 7,327 ballots cast by the city's 19,506 registered voters (180 ballots were spoiled), for a turnout of 37.6%. In the 2009 gubernatorial election, Democrat Jon Corzine received 6,247 ballots cast (70.9% vs. 48.0% countywide), ahead of Republican Chris Christie with 2,194 votes (24.9% vs. 45.8%), Independent Chris Daggett with 288 votes (3.3% vs. 4.7%) and other candidates with 31 votes (0.4% vs. 0.5%), among the 8,812 ballots cast by the city's 19,819 registered voters, yielding a 44.5% turnout (vs. 50.0% in the county).

In the 2016 presidential election, Democrat Hillary Clinton received 12,015 votes (76.0% vs. 54.2% countywide), ahead of Republican Donald Trump with 3,345 votes (21.2% vs. 41.1%) and other candidates with 380 votes (2.4% vs. 4.6%), among the 15,913 ballots cast by the city's 22,926 registered voters, for a turnout of 69.4% (vs. 72.5% in Bergen County). In the 2012 presidential election, Democrat Barack Obama received 11,335 votes (78.6% vs. 54.8% countywide), ahead of Republican Mitt Romney with 2,835 votes (19.6% vs. 43.5%) and other candidates with 113 votes (0.8% vs. 0.9%), among the 14,428 ballots cast by the city's 20,971 registered voters, for a turnout of 68.8% (vs. 70.4% in Bergen County). In the 2008 presidential election, Democrat Barack Obama received 11,711 votes (75.7% vs. 53.9% countywide), ahead of Republican John McCain with 3,498 votes (22.6% vs. 44.5%) and other candidates with 102 votes (0.7% vs. 0.8%), among the 15,461 ballots cast by the city's 20,616 registered voters, for a turnout of 75.0% (vs. 76.8% in Bergen County). In the 2004 presidential election, Democrat John Kerry received 9,815 votes (71.0% vs. 51.7% countywide), ahead of Republican George W. Bush with 3,870 votes (28.0% vs. 47.2%) and other candidates with 88 votes (0.6% vs. 0.7%), among the 13,818 ballots cast by the city's 19,013 registered voters, for a turnout of 72.7% (vs. 76.9% in the whole county).

Education

Public schools

The Hackensack Public Schools serve students in pre-kindergarten through twelfth grade. As of the 2019–20 school year, the district, comprised of six schools, had an enrollment of 5,790 students and 431.3 classroom teachers (on an FTE basis), for a student–teacher ratio of 13.4:1. Schools in the district, with 2019–20 enrollment data from the National Center for Education Statistics, are 
Early Childhood Development Center
Fairmount Elementary School (617 students in grades Pre-K–4), 
Fanny Meyer Hillers School (570 students in grades Pre-K–4), 
Jackson Avenue School (442 students in grades Pre-K–4), 
Nellie K. Parker School (533 students in grades Pre-K–4), 
Hackensack Middle School (1,571 students in grades 5–8) and 
Hackensack High School (1,918 students in grades 9–12).

Hackensack High School serves high school students living in neighboring communities as part of sending/receiving relationships with the respective districts, including about 250 from Maywood, 120 from Rochelle Park and 250 from South Hackensack as of 2012. Teterboro residents had been able to choose between Hackensack High School and Hasbrouck Heights School District's Hasbrouck Heights High School. In March 2020, the Maywood Public Schools received approval from the New Jersey Department of Education to end the relationship it had established with Hackensack in 1969 and begin transitioning incoming ninth graders to Henry P. Becton Regional High School beginning in the 2020–2021 school year.

Bergen Arts and Science Charter School serves public school students from Hackensack, as well as those from Garfield and Lodi.

Public school students from the borough, and all of Bergen County, are eligible to attend the secondary education programs offered by the Bergen County Technical Schools, which include the Bergen County Academies in Hackensack and the Bergen Tech campus in Teterboro or Paramus. The district offers programs on a shared-time or full-time basis, with admission based on a selective application process and tuition covered by the student's home school district.

Private schools
The First Baptist Church operates Bergen County Christian Academy, a K–12 school that was established in 1972 and is located at Union Street and Conklin Place.

The YCS George Washington School is a nonprofit private school for classified students ages 5–14 in grades K–8 who are experiencing behavioral and/or emotional difficulties. Its population consists of students who reside at the YCS Holley Child Care and Development Center in Hackensack and students within the surrounding communities whose needs cannot be adequately met in special education programs within their districts.

Padre Pio Academy is a defunct K–8 school that operated under the auspices of the Roman Catholic Archdiocese of Newark until its closure at the end of the 2012–2013 school year in the wake of declining enrollment and a deficit approaching $350,000. The school had been formed in 2009 by the diocese through the merger of St. Francis of Assisi School with Holy Trinity.

Colleges and universities
The Metropolitan Campus of Fairleigh Dickinson University straddles the Hackensack River in both Hackensack and Teaneck.

Bergen Community College has a location in Hackensack. The Philip Ciarco Jr. Learning Center, is located at 355 Main Street at the corner of Passaic Street.

Eastwick College is located at 250 Moore Street.

Healthcare 
Hackensack University Medical Center, part of Hackensack Meridian Health, is the primary health care provider and hospital for the city. Its main hospital campus, which includes a children's hospital, an all women's hospital, and Heart and Vascular Hospital, is located on 30 Prospect Avenue. The other facility that the hospital has is the John Theurer Cancer Center, located on 2nd Street. Hackensack University Medical Center has two medical offices located on Russell Place and Essex Center.

Transportation

Roads and highways

Interstate 80, Route 17, Route 4, and County Route 503 are among the many main roads serving Hackensack. Several bridges, including the Court Street Bridge, the Midtown Bridge and the Anderson Street Bridge span the Hackensack River.

Public transportation
The city is served by three train stations on NJ Transit's Pascack Valley Line, two of them in Hackensack, providing service to Hoboken Terminal, with connecting service to Penn Station New York and other NJ Transit service at Secaucus Junction. Anderson Street station serves central Hackensack while Essex Street station serves southern portions of the city. The New Bridge Landing station, located adjacent to the city line in River Edge also serves the northernmost parts of Hackensack, including The Shops at Riverside.

NJ Transit buses include lines 144, 157, 162, 163, 164, 165 and 168 serving the Port Authority Bus Terminal in Midtown Manhattan; the 171, 175, 178 and 182 to the George Washington Bridge Bus Station; the 76 to Newark; the 83 route to Jersey City; and local service on the 709, 712, 751, 752, 753, 755, 756, 762, 770, 772 and 780 lines. Many of the bus routes stop, originate and terminate at the Hackensack Bus Terminal, a regional transit hub. Route 1X jitney of Fordham Transit originates/terminates at the bus terminal with service Inwood, Manhattan via Fort Lee Road. Spanish Transportation and several other operators provide frequent jitney service along Route 4 between Paterson, New Jersey, and the George Washington Bridge Bus Station.

The Passaic-Bergen Rail Line planned to have two stops in Hackensack,  but the proposal went dormant.

Emergency services

Fire department
The City of Hackensack is protected by a force of 100 paid, professional firefighters of the city of Hackensack Fire Department (HFD). The Hackensack Fire Department was first established on April 1, 1871, as Bergen Hook & Ladder Co. 1. In 1911, the full-time fire department was organized. The Hackensack Fire Department responds to approximately 7,500 emergency calls annually.

The Hackensack Ford dealership fire on July 1, 1988, resulted in the deaths of five firefighters after a bowstring truss roof collapsed. A message issued a minute before the collapse ordering firefighters out was never received due to defective communications equipment and two firefighters who survived the initial collapse could not be rescued as their calls for help were not received.

Ten firefighters from Hackensack have died in the line of duty.

The Hackensack Fire Department currently operates out of four fire stations located throughout the city, under the command of a Deputy Chief / Tour Commander for each shift. The Hackensack Fire Department operates a fire apparatus fleet of four engines, one ladder, two rescues (Rescue 2 is  part of the Metro USAR Collapse Rescue Strike Team), one Metro USAR (urban search and rescue) Collapse Rescue Shoring Unit, one Special Operations (flood rescue) Unit, one Air Cascade Unit, one fire alarm maintenance bucket truck, two spare engines, and one spare ladder,  as well as several  special and support units.

The department is part of the Metro USAR Strike Team, which consists of nine North Jersey fire departments and other emergency services divisions working to address major emergency rescue situations.

Fire station locations and apparatus

Ambulance
The Hackensack Volunteer Ambulance Corps provides emergency medical services to Hackensack and other nearby towns through mutual aid agreements. The Corps operates nightly from 6pm to 6am, and 24 hours on Saturdays and Sundays. Daytime EMS is provided seven days a week by the Hackensack University Medical Center's ambulance service, overlapping volunteer coverage on weekends. Both the Hackensack University Medical Center and Hackensack Volunteer Ambulance Corps are dispatched by MICCOM, the Northern New Jersey Mobile Intensive Care Communications Network. MICCOM provides dispatch and emergency medical call taking with pre-arrival instructions and updates.

Points of interest

The city historian is Albert Dib. Walking tours are conducted of historic markers in downtown Hackensack, in and around The Green and lower Main Street, and a virtual historic walking tour is available as far north as the Pascack Valley Line crossing at Main Street.

The First Dutch Reformed Church ("Church on The Green") was built in 1696. In 1696 Major Berry donated land for the First Dutch Reformed Church, erected in that same year, which still stands in Hackensack today as the oldest church in Bergen County and the second oldest church in New Jersey. The following is list of notable people buried in the Church's adjoining cemetery:
 Enoch Poor, one of George Washington's officers.
 Richard Varick, former mayor of the city of New York and former New York Attorney General.

Bergen County's largest newspaper, The Record, a publication of the North Jersey Media Group, had been headquartered in Hackensack until moving to Woodland Park. Its  campus is largely abandoned and has been sold to be redeveloped for a mixed-use commercial project that would include 500 residential apartments and a hotel, in association with the river walkway project.

The New Jersey Naval Museum is home to the World War II submarine USS Ling, a Balao class submarine, and several smaller water vessels and artifacts. The museum was open select weekdays for group tours. In July and August 2018, several individuals broke in to the submarine attempting to steal artifacts and caused extensive flooding that severely damaged the vessel.

The Hackensack Cultural Arts Center, located at 39 Broadway, is the city's leading theater arts institution and houses many local arts groups such as the Teaneck Theater Company and the Hackensack Theater Company. The facility also serves as the summer indoor location for the Hudson Shakespeare Company in case of rain. Otherwise, the group performs outdoors at Staib Park, with two "Shakespeare Wednesdays" per month for each month of the summer.

The Shops at Riverside (formerly known as Riverside Square Mall), is an upscale shopping center located at the intersection of Route 4 and Hackensack Avenue at the northern edge of the city along the Hackensack River near its border with River Edge to the north and with Teaneck across the river. The mall also added an AMC Theatres dine-in movie theater on September 13, 2017, which replaced the former Saks Fifth Avenue store that opened in 1977 and closed down in 2014. The mall is known for its marble floors and attracts a great many upper-income shoppers from Manhattan and Northern Bergen County.

Hackensack's Main Street is devoted to shopping and includes some of the city's iconic landmarks, including the United Jersey Bank headquarters building and the former Woolworth site that is now a housewares store. The only remaining major store on Hackensack's Main Street had been Sears Roebuck and Co., which was located on the corner of Main and Anderson Streets. In July 2020, Sears announced that it would close its store in Hackensack. The site is close to the Anderson Street train station, and has been open since the 1930s.

Bergen County Jail is a detention center for both sentenced and unsentenced prisoners.  It is located on South River Street. The County is in the process of moving the County Police from the northern end of the city to a new site across from the Jail. The former site will be redeveloped as a "transit village" complex associated with the New Bridge Landing station in adjoining River Edge.

The city's Johnson Public Library at 274 Main Street is a member of the Bergen County Cooperative Library System. The library opened in 1901 with a gift from State Senator William M. Johnson.

Ice House is a complex with four full-sized skating rinks that opened in 1996. It is home to the New Jersey Avalanche mainstreamed and special needs hockey teams and several high school hockey teams, in addition to being the home rink of gold medalists Sarah Hughes, Elena Bereznaia and Anton Sikharulidze. At the 2018 Winter Olympics, there were 11 Olympic figure skaters—from Israel, Switzerland, Slovakia, Canada, and Australia—who trained at the Ice House for the ladies' singles, men's singles, pairs and ice dance competitions.

Other points of interest within the city include the Hackensack University Medical Center, Hackensack River County Park, Bowler City Bowling Lanes, Borg's Woods Nature Preserve, the Bergen County Court House and the Bergen Museum of Art & Science.

Local media
Radio station WNYM at 970 AM, is licensed to Hackensack and has its transmitter in the city. The station is currently owned by Salem Communications with a conservative talk format. During the 1970s, it played a Top 40 music radio format for several years, competing with Top 40 powerhouse 77 WABC.

In popular culture 

Hackensack has been mentioned in the lyrics of songs by several musical artists, many of whom have lived in New Jersey or New York City. The town was home to the original Van Gelder recording studio at 25 Prospect Avenue where the jazz musicians Sonny Rollins and Thelonious Monk recorded some of their landmark work. Monk recorded a tribute to Rudy Van Gelder entitled "Hackensack". Other notable examples of Hackensack in songs include:
 The 1929 Billy Murray/Walter Scanlan recording of "Shut the Door" has the lines, "I live out in Hackensack in a place down by the sea. (Oh, you live out in Hackensack. Well, don't blame that on me!)" despite the fact that Hackensack is a dozen miles from the sea, and on the other side of the Hudson.
 I Happen to Like New York by Cole Porter, written in 1930 for the musical The New Yorkers.
 "Back In Hackensack, New Jersey" which was written in 1924.
 "Roller Derby Queen" by Jim Croce, describes the tough titular character in the song as "She's my big blonde bomber, my heavy handed Hackensack mama."
 "Daddy Don't Live in That New York City No More" by Steely Dan from their 1975 album Katy Lied includes the rhyme "Driving like a fool out to Hackensack/Drinking his dinner from a paper sack".
 Fountains of Wayne, "Hackensack" (Welcome Interstate Managers, 2003), was covered by Katy Perry, 2009.
 Johnny Cash, "I've Been Everywhere" (Unchained) a 1996 cover of a number 1 hit in Country Music in November 1962 in the United States by Hank Snow.
 Peter Schickele (under the pseudonym P. D. Q. Bach), "O Little Town of Hackensack", a parody of the traditional carol "O Little Town of Bethlehem".
 "Movin' Out (Anthony's Song)" by Billy Joel includes the lines "Who needs a house out in Hackensack? Is that all you get for your money?"
 "Lost In Hollywood" by System of a Down includes the lyrics, "The lines in the letter said, 'We have gone to Hackensack'".
 Tom Rush's 2018 song "If I Never Get Back to Hackensack" pokes gentle fun at the town and mentions various other towns in New Jersey.

Hackensack also appears in movies, video games, books and television.
 In the 2001 film Zoolander someone threatens Mugatu by saying "Perhaps you'd like to go back to turning out novelty neck ties in Hackensack."
 In the 1978 film Superman: The Movie, Hackensack was to have been ground zero for a nuclear missile launched by Lex Luthor (Gene Hackman), as Superman (Christopher Reeve) is slowly dying from exposure to kryptonite. This however prompts Luthor's secretary, Eve Teschmacher, to save Superman's life, after making him promise to save her mother, a Hackensack resident.
 In the 1954 film Rear Window directed by Alfred Hitchcock, L.B. Jefferies' (Jimmy Stewart) maid, Stella (Thelma Ritter), muses that she had handled enough rhodium tri-eckonol pills to "put everybody in Hackensack to sleep for the winter." She makes the statement while she and Jefferies spy on his neighbors, one of which was laying out on a table a set of pills in an apparent contemplation of suicide.
 The 1985 film Brewster's Millions starred Richard Pryor, who played a pitcher for the Hackensack Bulls, a fictional minor-league baseball team that plays in a stadium where a railroad track runs across the outfield.
The 1997 game Grand Theft Auto features the district of Hackenslash, based on Hackensack.
 In the 1998 film Bride of Chucky, Chucky's human body is said to be buried in a fictional Hackensack cemetery.
The 2013 film Don Jon starring and directed by Joseph Gordon-Levitt was filmed in Hackensack. The Church of St. Anthony of Padua, located on S. Main Street, can be seen in the movie.
In the 1997 film adaptation Private Parts, when Howard Stern leaves WCCC for WWWW, he is speaking to DJ Fred Norris from a vehicle parked in front of 299 Main Street. The camera pans out and stores are seen in the backdrop as Howard Stern drives off.
The 2021 horror television series Chucky uses Hackensack as the main plot location. It was also revealed to be the hometown of the main antagonist of the series, Charles Lee "Chucky" Ray, in which he grew up.

Notable people

People who were born in, residents of, or otherwise closely associated with Hackensack include:

 Enzo Amore (born 1986 as Eric Arndt), former professional wrestler; worked for WWE
 Phil Arnold (1909–1968), actor
 Carol Arthur (1935–2020), actress who played a number of supporting roles in films by Mel Brooks
 Pete Athas (1946–2015), cornerback who played for the New York Giants during his six NFL seasons
 Barton Lidice Beneš (1942–2012), artist
 Ellsworth P. Bertholf (1866–1921), Commandant of the Coast Guard from 1915–1919
 James Black (1800–1872), blacksmith who is credited with creating the Bowie knife
 David Boll (born 1953), cyclist who competed in the individual road race event at the 1976 Summer Olympics
 Debby Boone (born 1956), singer
 Warren Boroson (born 1935), author and journalist
 Adam Boyd (1746–1835), represented New Jersey in Congress from 1803 to 1805, and again from 1808 to 1813
 Glenn Britt (1949–2014), CEO of Time Warner Cable from 2001 to December 2013
 David Brock (born 1962), Neo-Liberal  political operative, author and commentator who founded the media watchdog group Media Matters for America
 Hector Luis Bustamante (born 1972), Colombian-American actor
 Oleksii Bychenko (born 1988), Ukrainian-born Israeli Olympic figure skater who competed at the 2018 Winter Olympics
 Cody Calafiore (born 1990), reality television personality who was runner up on Big Brother 16
 Frank Capsouras (born 1947), weightlifter who represented the United States in the men's heavyweight event at the 1972 Summer Olympics
 Philip Carey (1925–2009), actor who starred in One Life to Live
 George Cassedy (1783–1842), member of the United States House of Representatives from New Jersey who served from 1821–1827
 Vinny Ciurciu (born 1980), linebacker who has played in the NFL with the Tampa Bay Buccaneers, Carolina Panthers, Minnesota Vikings and Detroit Lions
 Austen Crehore (1893–1962), World War I pilot in the Armée de l'Air and the recipient of the Legion of Honor and Croix de Guerre with two palms
 Dave Davis (1942–2022), professional ten-pin bowler; 1967 PBA Player of the Year and PBA Hall of Famer
 Christopher Dell (born 1956), diplomat who served as the United States Ambassador to Kosovo, Angola and Zimbabwe
 Anthony DiCosmo (born 1977), gridiron football player
 Harold Dow (1947–2010), correspondent on 48 Hours
 John Fenn (1917–2010), chemist who was a co-winner of the Nobel Prize in Chemistry in 2002 for his work in mass spectrometry
 F. Scott Fitzgerald, went to the prep school, the Newman School, in Hackensack in 1911
 Jim Finn (born 1976), New York Giants fullback
 Dave Fiore (born 1974), offensive lineman for the San Francisco 49ers and the Washington Redskins
 Percy Keese Fitzhugh (1876–1950), author of many popular children's books
 Silvia Fontana (born 1976), figure skater who represented Italy at the 2006 Winter Olympics in Turin
 Chet Forte (1935–1996), television director and sports radio talk show host
 Donald Frankos (1938–2011), contract killer and mob associate of the Lucchese crime family
 Bob Franks (1951–2010), represented  from 1993–2001
 Mike Fratello (born 1947), NBA coach and TV commentator
 Dean Gallo (1935–1994), represented  from 1985 until his death
 Elene Gedevanishvili (born 1990), figure skater who represented the nation of Georgia at the 2010 Winter Olympics in Vancouver
 Norm Gigon (1938–2013), utility player who played for the Chicago Cubs in 1967
 Doug Glanville (born 1970), Major League Baseball outfielder who played for the Philadelphia Phillies, Chicago Cubs and the Texas Rangers; writer and broadcaster
 Junior Glymph (born 1980), linebacker who played in the NFL for the Atlanta Falcons and Dallas Cowboys
 Navarro Gray (born 1979), lawyer best known for his accomplishments in the entertainment industry, including representing Fetty Wap
 David Grisman (born 1945), mandolin player
 John Groninga (born 1945), politician who served in the Iowa House of Representatives from the 20th district from 1983 to 1993
 Bill Hands (1940–2017), former Major League Baseball pitcher who played for the Chicago Cubs during his 11-year career
 Chet Hanulak (1933–2021), former NFL running back who played for four seasons for the Cleveland Browns
 Harry Harper (1895–1963), Major League Baseball pitcher from 1913 to 1923
 Archibald C. Hart (1873–1935), represented New Jersey's 6th congressional district from 1912–1913 and 1913–1917
 Matt Herr (born 1976), ice hockey forward who played for parts of four NHL seasons
 Henry Kent Hewitt (1887–1972), United States Navy commander of amphibious operations in North Africa and southern Europe throughout World War II
 John Huyler (1808–1870), represented  in the United States House of Representatives from 1857–1859
 Mark Ingram II (born 1989), Heisman Trophy winning running back and BCS National Champion at Alabama, who plays for the Baltimore Ravens
 Connor Jaeger (born 1991), competition swimmer who specializes in distance freestyle events
 Howie Janotta (1924–2010), professional basketball player who played for the Baltimore Bullets in 9 games during the 1949–50 NBA season
 Eric Karros (born 1967), Major League Baseball player and TV commentator
 Lena Kleinschmidt (1835–after 1886), German-born New York criminal who was a prominent jewel thief during the late 19th century
 Hailey Kops (born 2002), Israeli pair skater
 Louis F. Kosco (born 1932), politician who served in both the New Jersey General Assembly and the New Jersey Senate
 Harvey M. Krueger (1929–2017), investment banker who was CEO and President of Kuhn, Loeb & Co.
 Marc Kudisch (born 1966), stage actor
 Lauren Lake (born 1969), lawyer and presiding judge of Lauren Lake's Paternity Court
 Rich LeFurgy (born ), advertising consultant and investor
 Coi Leray (born 1997), rapper and songwriter
 William Alexander Linn (1846–1917), journalist and historian
 John Maessner (born 1969), soccer player and coach who played six seasons in Major League Soccer
 Roger Mandle (1941–2020), art historian, curator and academic administrator, who was president of the Rhode Island School of Design
 Hugh McCracken (1942–2013), rock guitarist and session musician
 James McEachin (born 1930), actor and author
 Earl Schenck Miers (1910–1972), historian who wrote extensively about the American Civil War
 E. Frederic Morrow (–1994), the first African American to hold an executive position at the White House, when he served President Dwight Eisenhower as Administrative Officer for Special Projects from 1955 to 1961
 John H. Morrow (1910–2000), diplomat, who was appointed by President Dwight Eisenhower in 1959 as the first Ambassador to independent Guinea
 Don Nelson (1927–2013), screenwriter, film producer and jazz musician, best known for his work on the sitcom The Adventures of Ozzie and Harriet
 Richard Cooper Newick (1926–2013), multihull sailboat designer
 Donald Nichols (1923–1992), United States Air Force officer who worked in military intelligence
 Dan Oates (born 1955), police chief of Miami Beach, Florida
 Frederick Albion Ober (1849–1913), naturalist and writer
 Danny Oquendo (born 1987), wide receiver who played for the Maryland Terrapins football team
 Deborah Oropallo (born 1954), artist who is best known for her digital montages
 William A. Pailes (born 1952), United States Air Force astronaut in the Manned Spaceflight Engineer Program during the mid-1980s whi served as a Payload Specialist on STS-51-J Atlantis (October 3–7, 1985)
 John B. Paolella (born 1949), politician who represented the 38th Legislative District in both houses of the New Jersey Legislature
 Nellie Morrow Parker (1902–1998), first African American school teacher in Bergen County, New Jersey, and the namesake of Nellie K. Parker Elementary School
 Randi Patterson (born 1985), former professional soccer player
 Randolph E. Paul (1890–1956), lawyer specializing in tax law who has been credited as "...an architect of the modern tax system"
 Bill Peck (–2017), football player and coach who was head coach of the Middle Tennessee Blue Raiders football team in the 1970s
 Melissa Perello (born 1976), chef
 Stan Pitula (1931–1965), right-handed pitcher who played for the Cleveland Indians
 Charles Lane Poor (1866–1951), astronomy professor, noted for his opposition to Albert Einstein's theory of relativity
 Willie Prall (born 1950), pitcher who appeared in three games in 1950 for the Chicago Cubs
 George Prévost (1767–1816), British Army officer and colonial administrator
 Jahvon Quinerly (born 1998), college basketball player for the Alabama Crimson Tide men's basketball team
 Alice Huyler Ramsey (1886–1983), first woman to drive across the United States from coast to coast
 John R. Ramsey (1862–1933), politician who represented New Jersey's 6th congressional district in the United States House of Representatives from 1917 to 1921
 David Remnick (born 1958), journalist, writer, and magazine editor who won a Pulitzer Prize in 1994 for his book Lenin's Tomb: The Last Days of the Soviet Empire
 Joe Rizzo (born 1998), professional baseball third baseman
 Nicholas Romayne (1756–1817), physician
 Hatch Rosdahl (1941–2004), football player who played for the Buffalo Bills and Kansas City Chiefs
 Jason Rullo (born 1972), professional drummer, one of the founding members of progressive metal band Symphony X
 Alfred D. Schiaffo (1920–1988), politician who served in the New Jersey Senate from the 13th district from 1968 to 1973
 Wally Schirra (1923–2007), NASA astronaut, one of the original seven astronauts chosen for Project Mercury
 Walter G. Schroeder (1927–2021), politician who was a member of the Oregon House of Representatives from 1985 to 1993
 Dave Scott (born 1953), offensive lineman who played for the Atlanta Falcons
 Chris Smalls (born 1988/1989), labor organizer known for his role in leading Amazon worker organization in the New York City borough of Staten Island
 Robert Stiles (born 1959), field hockey player who competed in the men's tournament at the 1984 Summer Olympics
 Adel Tankova (born 2000), Ukrainian-born Israeli Olympic figure skater who competed at the 2018 Winter Olympics
 Warren Terhune (1869–1920), United States Navy Commander and the 13th Governor of American Samoa
 Russell Thacher (1919–1990), author and film producer who co-produced the films Soylent Green and The Last Hard Men together with Walter Seltzer
 Joe Lynn Turner (born 1951), singer
 Rudy Van Gelder (1924–2016), recording engineer who taped many jazz albums for Blue Note Records in his Hackensack recording studio in the 1950s
 Richard Varick (1753–1831), lawyer and politician
 Charles H. Voorhis (1833–1896), lawyer and judge from New Jersey who served one term representing New Jersey's 5th congressional district
 Douglas Watt (1914–2009), theater critic for the New York Daily News
 Teresa Weatherspoon (born 1965), professional basketball player, formerly with WNBA's New York Liberty
 Leslie West (1945–2020), rock guitarist, vocalist, and songwriter who is best known as a founding member of the hard rock band Mountain
 William B. Widnall (1906–1983), member of the United States House of Representatives for 24 years representing New Jersey's 7th congressional district
 Anna Wessels Williams (1863–1954), physician who worked as a bacteriologist at the first U.S. municipal diagnostic laboratory, helped develop the diphtheria antitoxin and was the first woman to be elected chair of the laboratory section of the American Public Health Association
 Bill Willoughby (born 1957), basketball player who, along with Darryl Dawkins, were the first high school players drafted by the NBA after they graduated in 1975
 Chris Wragge (born 1970), news anchor for WCBS-TV
 Ronald Zilberberg (born 1996), Israeli Olympic figure skater who competed at the 2018 Winter Olympics
 Ken Zisa (born 1954), politician who served as a member of the New Jersey General Assembly from 1994 to 2002, where he represented the 37th Legislative District

References

Sources 
 Municipal Incorporations of the State of New Jersey (according to Counties) prepared by the Division of Local Government, Department of the Treasury (New Jersey); December 1, 1958.
 Clayton, W. Woodford; and Nelson, Nelson. History of Bergen and Passaic Counties, New Jersey, with Biographical Sketches of Many of its Pioneers and Prominent Men. Philadelphia: Everts and Peck, 1882.
 Harvey, Cornelius Burnham (ed.), Genealogical History of Hudson and Bergen Counties, New Jersey. New York: New Jersey Genealogical Publishing Co., 1900.
 Lark, Terry (editor), Hackensack – Heritage to Horizons, The Hackensack Bicentennial Committee, The City of Hackensack, 1976
 Van Valen, James M. History of Bergen County, New Jersey. New York: New Jersey Publishing and Engraving Co., 1900.
 Westervelt, Frances A. (Frances Augusta), 1858–1942, History of Bergen County, New Jersey, 1630–1923, Lewis Historical Publishing Company, 1923.

External links 

 
 Borg's Woods Nature Preserve
 Hackensack, New Jersey, at City-Data
 Hackensack Community Profile and Resource Links, NJ HomeTownLocator
 U.S. Census Bureau – State & County QuickFacts for Hackensack

 
1693 establishments in New Jersey
1921 establishments in New Jersey
1923 Municipal Manager Law
Cities in Bergen County, New Jersey
County seats in New Jersey
Populated places established in 1693
New Jersey populated places on the Hackensack River